Lulsgate may refer to several places in North Somerset, England:
 Bristol Airport, an airport formerly known as Lulsgate
 Lulsgate Plateau, an outlier of the Mendip Hills
 Lulsgate Quarry, a Site of Special Scientific Interest
 Lulsgate Aerodrome, a motor racing circuit
 Lulsgate Bottom, a settlement